Hyperolius leucotaenius is a species of frog in the family Hyperoliidae.
It is endemic to Democratic Republic of the Congo.
Its natural habitats are subtropical or tropical moist montane forests, swamps, freshwater marshes, and intermittent freshwater marshes.
It is threatened by habitat loss.

At one time thought to be extinct, in 2011 Hyperolius leucotaenius was found and photographed on the banks of the Elila River, a tributary of the Lualaba.

References

leucotaenius
Endemic fauna of the Democratic Republic of the Congo
Amphibians described in 1950
Taxonomy articles created by Polbot